The list of suburbs in the city of Mackay in northern Queensland, Australia, and includes the following suburbs:
 Inner suburbs
 Mackay (the central suburb and central business district)
East Mackay
 West Mackay
 North Mackay
 South Mackay
Outer suburbs
Andergrove
Beaconsfield
Blacks Beach
Bucasia
Cremorne
Dolphin Heads
Eimeo
Erakala
Foulden
Glenella
Mackay Harbour
Mount Pleasant
Nindaroo
Ooralea
Paget
Racecourse
Richmond
Rural View
Shoal Point
Slade Point
Te Kowai

See also 

Mackay Region List of Towns & Localities
List of Brisbane suburbs
List of Gold Coast suburbs

References

 
Mackay
Mackay suburbs